Ammit ("Devourer of the Dead"; also rendered Ammut or Ahemait) was an ancient Egyptian goddess with the forequarters of a lion, the hindquarters of a hippopotamus, and the head of a crocodile—the three largest "man-eating" animals known to ancient Egyptians. In ancient Egyptian religion, Ammit played an important role during the funerary ritual, the Judgment of the Dead.

Nomenclature 
Ammit means 'devourer of the dead" ('Devoureress of the Dead') or 'Swallower of the Dead', where  is the verb 'to swallow', and  signifies 'the dead', more specifically the dead who had been adjudged not to belong to the  'blessed dead' who abided by the code of truth (ma'at).

Iconography 

Ammit is denoted a female entity, commonly depicted with the head of a crocodile, the forelegs and upper body of a lion (or leopard), and the hind legs and lower body of a hippopotamus. The combination of three deadly predators: crocodile, lion, and hippo, suggests that no one can escape annihilation, even in the afterlife. She is part lioness, but her leonine features may present in the form of a mane, which is usually associated with male lions. In the Papyrus of Ani, Ammit is adorned with a tri-colored nemes,  which were worn by pharaohs as a symbol of kingship.

Versions of the Book of the Dead from the New Kingdom started to include Ammit. During the eighteenth dynasty, the crocodile-lion-hippopotamus hybrid was the conventional depiction of Ammit. She appeared in scenes showing the Judgment of the Dead, in tombs and funerary papyri. In this scene, Ammit is shown with other Egyptian gods in Duat, waiting to learn if she can consume the heart of the deceased. A stylistic shift occurred, during the Third Intermediate Period. Around the twenty-first dynasty, the Judgment of the Dead scene was painted on the interior and exterior of coffins. The coffin lid of Ankh-hor, a chief from the twenty-second dynasty featured Ammit bearing the head of a hippopotamus, and the body of a dog with rows of paps.While the Papyrus of Nes-min (ca. 300-250 BCE) from the Ptolemaic Period, portrayed Ammit with the head of a crocodile, and the body of a dog.

Role in ancient Egyptian Religion 
Unlike other gods featured in ancient Egyptian religion, Ammit was not worshipped. Instead, Ammit was feared and believed to be a demon rather than a deity, due to her role as the 'devourer of the dead'. During the New Kingdom, deities and demons were differentiated by having a cult or center of worship. Demons in ancient Egyptian religion had supernatural powers and roles, but were ranked below the gods and did not have a place of worship. In the case of Ammit, she was a guardian demon. A guardian demon was tied to a specific place, such as Duat. Their appearance was based on a hybrid of an animal or a human and was denoted so the dead could recognize them. Guardian demons that appeared as a hybrid of animals were an amalgamation of traits meant to be feared and to differentiate them from deities associated with humanity.

Prior to the New Kingdom and the creation of Chapter 125 in the Book of the Dead, Ammit did not have a large presence in ancient Egyptian religion. However, Khonsu, the god of the moon, was depicted as a 'devourer of the dead and hearts' in Old Kingdom pyramid texts and Middle Kingdom coffin texts.

Throughout the First Intermediate Period and the Middle Kingdom, a collection of spells was created to form the Coffin Texts. In Spell 310, Khonsu burned hearts heavier than the feather of ma'at during the Judgment of the Dead. In Spell 311, Khonsu devoured the hearts of the gods and the dead. Divine hearts were devoured for their power. Hearts deemed impure during judgment were devoured, leaving the deceased trapped in Duat. These spells were among those adapted into the Book of the Dead starting in the New Kingdom.

Spells 310 and 311 of the Coffin Texts are referred to in Chapters 79, and 125 in the Book of the Dead. Chapter 79 refers to the burning of the heart, while the scene of judgment and devouring of hearts is found in Chapter 125. Instead of Khonsu devouring the heart of the dead, Ammit was referred to as the 'devourer of the dead'. Ammit was present during the weighing of the heart, usually near the scale waiting to learn the results. If the heart of the dead was impure, she ate their heart leaving them soulless and trapped in Duat.

Weighing of the Heart 

The Book of the Dead was a collection of funerary texts used to guide the dead to Duat, the Egyptian underworld. The process of the Judgment of the Dead was described in Chapter 125. The ruler of Duat, Osiris, presided over judgment. New Kingdom depictions of this scene occurred at the Hall of the Two Truths (or Two Maats). Anubis, the Guardian of the Scales, conducted the dead towards the weighing scale. Ammit would be situated near the scale, awaiting the results. While Thoth, the god of hieroglyphs and judgment, would record the results. The heart of the deceased was weighed against the feather of Ma'at, the goddess of truth. The feather of Ma'at symbolized the balance, and truthfulness needed to be present during one's lifetime. The heart or Ib, represented the individual's soul and was the key to traveling to Aaru.

In Chapter 125 of the Book of the Dead, the deceased is given a series of declarations to recite at the Judgment of the Dead. The Declaration of Innocence was a list of 42 sins the deceased was innocent of committing. The Declaration to the Forty-two Gods and The Address to the Gods were recited directly to the gods, proclaiming the deceased's purity and loyalty.

 After the declarations are recited, their heart is weighted. If the heart was weighted less than the feather of Ma'at, the deceased was ruled to be pure. Thoth recorded the result and Osiris would allow the deceased to continue their voyage toward Aaru and immortality. If the heart was heavier than the feather of Ma'at, the deceased was deemed impure. Ammit would devour their heart, leaving the deceased without a soul. Ancient Egyptians believed the soul would become restless forever, dying a second death. Instead of living in Aaru, the soulless individual would be stuck in Duat.

Ammit is often depicted sitting in a crouched position near the scale, ready to eat the heart. Ancient Egyptians were buried with a copy of the Book of the Dead, guaranteeing they would be successful at the Judgment of the Dead. Thus, Ammit was left hungry without any hearts to eat, and the consecrated dead was then able to bypass the Lake of Fire, featured in Chapter 126 of the Book of the Dead.

In popular culture 
Saba Mubarak portrays Ammit in the Marvel Cinematic Universe (MCU) television series Moon Knight (2022). In the Mummies Alive! cartoon series, the main villain Scarab accidentally summons Ammut, and she sticks around. In the show, she is a dog-like and rather small-sized pet who does not speak. In Rick Riordan’s series, the Kane Chronicles, Ammit is portrayed. In Primeval, Ammit was a Pristichampsus that came through an Anomaly a gateway in time to ancient Egypt and ancient Egyptians believed they were gods.

Gallery

See also 
Book of the Dead
Cerberus, a chthonic creature in Greek mythology

Explanatory notes

References 
Citations

Bibliography

External links 
 

Egyptian demons
Egyptian goddesses
Book of the Dead
Mythological hybrids
Lion deities
Justice goddesses
Female legendary creatures
Egyptian legendary creatures
Mythological monsters
Egyptian underworld
Egyptian death gods